Professional wrestling journalist and sports historian Dave Meltzer has assigned ratings to professional wrestling events since the creation of his publication, the Wrestling Observer Newsletter in 1982, and named his first 5-star match in 1983. Receiving a 5 or higher star rating is considered by many to be a great achievement.

The first match rated more than five stars by Meltzer was Ric Flair vs Ricky Steamboat in 1989. The highest-ever rating is seven stars, awarded to Kazuchika Okada vs Kenny Omega at Dominion 6.9 in Osaka-jo Hall in June 2018.

There have been 220 matches awarded 5 or more stars; Mitsuharu Misawa and Will Ospreay are tied for the most individual matches with 25 apiece.

Matches

1980s

1990s

2000s

2010s

2020s

Wrestlers with the most 5-or-higher-star matches

Wrestlers with the most higher-than-5-star matches

Promotions with the most 5-or-higher-star matches

Promotions with the most higher-than-5-star matches

See also
 Professional wrestling in Canada
 Professional wrestling in Japan
 Professional wrestling in Mexico
 Professional wrestling in the United Kingdom
 Professional wrestling in the United States
 Professional wrestling match types

Notes

References

External links

Top 100 Matches on Cagematch
Top Rated Matches of All Time on The Internet Wrestling Database

Wrestling Observer Newsletter
Professional wrestling matches
Professional wrestling-related lists